The Junior Eurovision Song Contest 2008 was the sixth edition of the annual Junior Eurovision Song Contest, which is the world's largest song contest for children. It was held at the "Spyros Kyprianou" Athletic Centre in Lemesos, Cyprus and hosted by Alex Michael and Sophia Paraskeva. The theme of the event was "Fun in the Sun", despite the fact that there were thunderstorms in Lemesos the day of the contest. It was won by the Georgian trio Bzikebi, with the song "Bzz..". Ukraine took 2nd place and Lithuania finished 3rd. Bzikebi also became the first group act to win Junior Eurovision.

For the contest, various changes to the rules were made. One was that adults could assist children to write the songs submitted to their national broadcaster; previously only children could write the songs, with no assistance from adults. Another change was only six people could be on stage during a performance, instead of eight. The most significant change, however, was only half of the vote was decided by the tele-voters. Before the 2008 contest tele-voters completely decided the whole result. The other half of the result was decided by a jury of adults and children.

Location

Bidding phase and host selection
On 27 May 2007, the Eurovision Steering Group decided to award CyBC of Cyprus the rights to host the 2008 contest, over bids from TV4 of Sweden and NTU of Ukraine, the latter of which would later host the 2009 edition.

Venue

The Spyros Kyprianou Athletic Center (Greek: Αθλητικό Κέντρο "Σπύρος Κυπριανού"), also known as Palais des sports, is the biggest and the most imposing multi dynamic indoor athletic arena in Cyprus. It is named after the late president of Cyprus Spyros Kyprianou. 

The shuttle of the centre can host more than 6,255 spectators and at least 42 wheelchair spots. Moreover, the centre is used especially for the sport events of local schools in Limassol greater area.

This project was conducted by the Cyprus Sports Organisation and was constructed north of the city of Limassol near Kato Polemidia and by the side of Limassol - Troodos road. Construction of the project began in late 2002 and was completed at the end of 2005 at a total cost of approximately CY£8.5 million.

Format

Visual design
The stage, which was designed by George Papadopoulos, was nominated for the prestigious international "Live Design Excellence Awards". The design is an abstract composition and consists of a round stage representing the island of Cyprus, real water along the front of the stage, two jetties, the waves breaking and moving away from the island and five sailing boats with oars. During the competitive performances, a beach ball with the design of the performer's national flag would be floating in the on-stage pond while they were performing.

The stage was constructed between 30 October 2008 and 14 November 2008.

Presenters
On 10 September 2008, the hosts were announced as Alex Michael and Sophia Paraskeva; both presenters with Cypriot backgrounds.

Running order
On 13 October 2008, the draw of the running order took place live on CyBC 1. This involved drawing the first and last countries and performers, and then drawing countries into various 'pots' to decide when they would perform. The full running order was announced on 14 October 2008.

Performances
The show was opened with a dance act featuring Yiorgos Ioannides and Mariam Venizelou. Dima Bilan performed two songs during the interval, alongside Evridiki and her husband Dimitris Korgialas who performed the theme song of the contest, "Fun in the Sun". The show came to a close with all participants performing "Hand in Hand", which was written especially for UNICEF and the Junior Eurovision Song Contest that year.

Voting
As in all previous Eurovision Song Contests each country gave their top 10 countries songs points from 1 point for their 10th favourite song up until 8 points for their 3rd favourite song. Then 10 and 12 points were given for the second favorite and favorite respectively. But, the difference between this contest and other past contests is this is the first Eurovision Song Contest that implements a jury vote that counts for half of each countries vote. Profits made from the televoting was donated to UNICEF.

Participating countries
Fifteen countries took part in the 2008 Junior Eurovision Song Contest: Armenia, Belarus, Belgium, Bulgaria, Cyprus, Macedonia, Georgia, Greece, Lithuania, Malta, Netherlands, Romania, Russia, Serbia, and Ukraine. Portugal would return in  after winning the adult contest for the first time that same year.

On the other hand, Israel and Bosnia and Herzegovina announced their intention to participate, but decided both to withdraw before the contest. Welsh language broadcaster S4C considered the possibility of participation, but in the end it was decided they would not to participate in the competition, because their debut was rejected because Wales isn't a sovereign state.  Only the BBC has the exclusive right to represent the United Kingdom. Wales later debuted in the  contest.

Azerbaijan announced its intention to take part also, but withdrew from the contest in early October. According to İctimai Televiziya və Radio Yayımları Şirkəti, the network was unable to select and prepare children for such a high scale event without proper help from other governmental structures and bodies. The broadcaster also confirmed payment of a fine to the EBU due to its late withdrawal. Poland had also considered participation but decided that it would not take part this year. The 2008 contest was the first Junior Eurovision Song Contest to have no debuting countries.

Participants and results 

For the first time, each country decided their votes through a 50% jury and 50% televoting system which decided their top ten songs. The only country that did not use this system was Ukraine who calculated their vote using a jury. Ukrainian broadcaster NTU opted not to broadcast the contest live, but to air it deferred on Sunday 23 November as Saturday 22 November was Holodomor Remembrance Day in the country.

Detailed voting results 

Georgia and Macedonia awarded their points last due to technical problems.

12 points
Below is a summary of all 12 points received. All countries were given 12 points at the start of voting to ensure that no country finished with nul points.

Spokespersons 

 Iulia Ciobanu
 Mary Sahakyan
 Anjelica Misevich
 Sarina
 Stefani Trepekli
 Ana Davitaia
 Chloé Ditlefsen
 Marina Baltadzi
 Anđelija Erić
 Francesca Zarb
 Famke Rauch
 Marietta
 Lina Joy
 Marija Zafirovska
 Christina Christofi

Other countries 

For a country to be eligible for potential participation in the Junior Eurovision Song Contest, it needs to be an active member of the EBU.
 Azerbaijan was originally going to participate but withdrew on 15 October 2008, due to the lack of participants signed up for the national final.
 Bosnia and Herzegovina were also set to participate but later withdrew. Bosnia and Herzegovina also unsuccessfully attempted to participate in 2007.

Broadcasts 

A live broadcast of the Junior Eurovision Song Contest was available worldwide via satellite through European streams such as TVRi, ERT World, ARMTV, RTS Sat and MKTV Sat. The official Eurovision Song Contest website also provided a live stream without commentary via the peer-to-peer medium Octoshape.

Official album

Junior Eurovision Song Contest 2008, is a compilation album put together by the European Broadcasting Union, and was released by Universal Music Group on 10 October 2008. The album features all the songs from the 2008 contest, along with karaoke versions.

See also
 Eurovision Song Contest 2008
 Eurovision Dance Contest 2008
 Eurovision Young Musicians 2008

Notes

References

 
2008
2008 in Cyprus
Eurovision Song Contest 2008
2008 song contests
Entertainment events in Cyprus
November 2008 events in Europe
Limassol